Rich Cohen (born July 30, 1968) is an American non-fiction writer. He is a contributing editor at Vanity Fair and Rolling Stone. He is co-creator, with Martin Scorsese, Mick Jagger and Terence Winter, of the HBO series Vinyl. His works have been New York Times bestsellers, New York Times Notable Books, and have been collected in the Best American Essays series. He lives in Ridgefield, Connecticut, with his four sons. 

He is not to be confused with Richard A. Cohen.

Early life
Cohen was born in Lake Forest, Illinois, and grew up in Chicago's North Shore suburb of Glencoe. He received his BA from Tulane University in 1990. His father, the negotiator Herb Cohen, grew up with the broadcaster Larry King; Cohen worked on King's CNN show for a short time after graduation. His sister, Sharon Cohen Levin, is an Assistant United States Attorney of the Southern District of New York. His brother, Steve Cohen, a former aide to New York governor Andrew Cuomo, is a partner at the law firm Zuckerman Spaeder in New York City.

Career

Journalism
An admirer of the works of journalists A. J. Liebling, Ian Frazier, and Joseph Mitchell, Cohen took a job as a messenger at the offices of The New Yorker magazine, where he published twelve stories in the "Talk of the Town" section in eighteen months. After working as a reporter for the New York Observer, in 1994 Cohen joined the staff of Rolling Stone. Since 2007, he has been a contributing editor at Vanity Fair. In  2022, Cohen became a columnist for the Wall Street Journal.

Author
Cohen published his first book Tough Jews: Fathers, Sons, and Gangster Dreams—a non-fiction account of the Jewish gangsters of 1930s Brooklyn, notably those involved with Murder, Inc.—in 1998. Cohen's second work, The Avengers: A Jewish War Story (2000), follows a group of anti-Nazi partisans in the forests of Lithuania at the close of World War II.

Cohen's third work, the memoir Lake Effect was published in 2002. In 2006, Cohen published Sweet and Low: A Family Story, a memoir about the creation of the artificial sweetener, a product invented by Benjamin Eisenstadt, Cohen's grandfather. 

In 2009, Cohen published Israel is Real: An Obsessive Quest to Understand the Jewish Nation and its History. In 2010, Cohen co-wrote the memoir When I Stop Talking, You'll Know I'm Dead, the story of American film producer Jerry Weintraub. The book was a New York Times bestseller.

Cohen's story of United Fruit president and banana king Sam Zemurray, The Fish That Ate the Whale, was published by Farrar, Straus & Giroux in 2012. In 2013, Cohen published Monsters: The 1985 Chicago Bears and the Wild Heart of Football, a story of football through the eyes of the 1985 Chicago Bears. The book was a New York Times best seller. Cohen's next book, a narrative history of The Rolling Stones called The Sun and The Moon and the Rolling Stones, was published by Spiegel and Grau in May 2016. Cohen had been on close terms with the Rolling Stones since the mid-1990s. 

Cohen's 2019 book, The Last Pirate of New York: A Ghost Ship, a Killer, and the Birth of a Gangster Nation, details the life and times of Albert W. Hicks, an American criminal active from about 1840 to 1860.

Film and television
On February 26, 2007, Paramount Pictures announced it had closed a deal to produce The Long Play, a screenplay which Cohen wrote several drafts for and did research on, for producers Mick Jagger and Martin Scorsese, with Scorsese directing. 

In 2012 and 2013 Cohen was an advisor on the Starz series Magic City.

Cohen is a co-creator, with Martin Scorsese, Mick Jagger and Terence Winter, of the HBO series Vinyl.

Critical reception
In 2013, NPR editor Tina Brown called Cohen's essay on the financier Ted Forstmann "very entertaining" and a "must read".

In The New York Times Book Review, writer Vincent Patrick called Cohen's book Tough Jews "marvelous and colorful" with "writing good enough to cause one, at times, to reread a page in order to savor the description". Another New York Times critic Christopher Lehmann-Haupt, called it "exuberant" and "a vivid narrative"; Cohen's book had "taken the noise of these facts and turned it from gunfire into a kind of music".

Critic Michiko Kakutani called Cohen's Sweet and Low "a classic" ... "A telling—and often hilarious—parable about the pursuit and costs of the American Dream". In 2006, the book made the New York Times list of 100 notable books.

In The New York Times Book Review, writer Tony Horwitz said Israel is Real "accomplished the miraculous. It made a subject that has vexed me since childhood into a riveting story." 

Critic and historian Mark Lewis called The Fish That Ate the Whale "Kiplingesque" and "fascinating." In The Christian Science Monitor, critic Chris Hartman called the book "masterful and elegantly written ... a cautionary tale for the ages". 

Reviewing The Last Pirate of New York in the Wall Street Journal, Rinker Buck wrote, "'The Last Pirate of New York' is history-lite at its best, and readers will finish it with a satisfaction deeply relevant today."

Awards
2009 The Best American Essays of 2008

Select bibliography
 
 
 
 
 
 
 
 
 
 
 
 
 
 
Ghostwritten

References

External links
Official website
 NPR's Weekend Edition, The Fish That Ate The Whale
 CBS News, The Fish That Ate The Whale
 Appearance on All Things Considered
 Appearance on NPR's The Leonard Lopate Show 2006
 Appearance on NPR's The Leonard Lopate Show 2005
 On Hunter S. Thompson, in The New York Times Book Review
The Avengers Excerpt, Newsweek Magazine
 Random House author page

Jewish American writers
American male non-fiction writers
Tulane University alumni
1968 births
Living people
American magazine journalists
21st-century American Jews